The Colombian four-eyed frog (Pleurodema brachyops; in Spanish: sapito lipon) is a species of frog in the family Leptodactylidae.
It is found in an area stretching from Guyana and northern Brazil (Roraima state) through Venezuela (including Isla Margarita) and Colombia into Panama as well as the Netherlands Antilles.

The common name "four-eyed frog" refers to two inguinal poison glands that resemble eyes.  When threatened, the frog lowers its head and raises its rear.  When the frog adopts this posture, the poison glands are also raised toward the predator.  The predator may also confuse the frog's raised posterior for the head of a larger animal.

The natural habitat of the Colombian four-eyed frog is open savanna and grassland. It is a very common species. While these frogs use ephemeral or permanent small water pools for breeding, they can be found far from water. During the dry season, they hide in the soil and emerge when the rains start.

References

Pleurodema
Amphibians of Brazil
Amphibians of Colombia
Amphibians of Guyana
Amphibians of Panama
Amphibians of Venezuela
Fauna of the Dutch Caribbean
Fauna of the Netherlands Antilles
Taxonomy articles created by Polbot
Amphibians described in 1869